The following is a list of notable deaths in February 2012.

Entries for each day are listed alphabetically by surname.  A typical entry lists information in the following sequence:
Name, age, country of citizenship and reason for notability, established cause of death, reference (and language of reference, if not English).

February 2012

1
Herb Adams, 83, American baseball player (Chicago White Sox).
Gerlando Alberti, 84, Italian Sicilian Mafioso, cancer.
Gerhard Bosse, 90, German violinist and conductor.
Robert B. Cohen, 86, American businessman, founder of Hudson News, progressive supranuclear palsy.
Herb Conn, 91, American climbing and caving pioneer.
Don Cornelius, 75, American television host and producer (Soul Train), suicide by gunshot.
Andrij Dobriansky, 81, Ukrainian-born American opera singer, diabetes and heart disease.
Angelo Dundee, 90, American boxing trainer (Muhammad Ali).
Joe Ekins, 88, British World War II soldier.
Fabián Estapé, 88, Spanish economist.
Jannatul Ferdous, 74, Bangladeshi teacher and politician.
André Génovès, 70, French film producer and director.
Tony Giorgio, 88, Italian-American actor and magician, heart failure.
Sara González Gómez, 62 or 64, Cuban singer.
John Harrison, 87, Australian Olympic rower.
Ruth Hausmeister, 99, German actress (Zwei Brüder, The Longest Day).
Ladislav Kuna, 64, Slovak football player and manager.
Robert Lawless, 74, American anthropologist.
Ardath Mayhar, 81, American author.
Ingolf Mork, 64, Norwegian Olympic ski jumper.
David Peaston, 54, American R&B singer, complications of diabetes.
Lutz Philipp, 71, German Olympic athlete.
Gilbert Poirot, 67, French Olympic ski jumper.
Charlie Spoonhour, 72, American basketball coach (Southwest Missouri State, Saint Louis University), complications from lung disease.
Jerry Steiner, 94, American basketball player (Fort Wayne Pistons).
Andrzej Sztolf, 70, Polish Olympic ski jumper.
Wisława Szymborska, 88, Polish poet, Nobel Prize in Literature (1996).

2
Joyce Barkhouse, 98, Canadian children's writer (Pit Pony), heart attack.
Daphne Brooker, 84, British model, costume designer, and professor, bronchopneumonia.
Paul Consbruch, 81, German Roman Catholic prelate, Auxiliary Bishop of Paderborn (1980–1999).
Frederick William Danker, 91, American lexicographer and New Testament scholar.
David Edelsten, 78, British writer and army officer.
George Esper, 79, American journalist and foreign correspondent (Associated Press).
Elwyn Friedrich, 78, Swiss Olympic ice hockey player, myocardial infarction.
Luis Javier Garrido, 71, Mexican political analyst.
Dorothy Gilman, 88, American spy novelist (The Unexpected Mrs. Pollifax), complications of Alzheimer's disease.
Jorge Glusberg, 79, Argentine author and curator, director of the Museo Nacional de Bellas Artes.
John Houlder, 95, British engineer.
Nassib Lahoud, 67, Lebanese politician.
James F. Lloyd, 89, American politician, U.S. Representative from California (1975–1981), stroke.
Asko Mäkilä, 67, Finnish footballer

3
Steve Appleton, 51, American businessman (Micron Technology), plane crash.
Christopher Asir, 64, Indian bishop, cancer.
John Christopher, 89, British science fiction author (The Tripods, The Sword of the Spirits).
HIM Damsyik, 82, Indonesian dancer and actor.
Francis Patrick Donovan, 90, Australian academic, lawyer, and diplomat.
Ben Gazzara, 81, American actor (Anatomy of a Murder, The Big Lebowski, Road House), pancreatic cancer.
Terence Hildner, 49, American general, commander of the 13th Sustainment Command (Expeditionary).
Raj Kanwar, 50, Indian film director and producer, kidney failure.
Karibasavaiah, 52, Indian film actor.
Zalman King, 69, American film director (Wild Orchid) and producer (9½ Weeks), cancer.
Karlo Maquinto, 21, Filipino boxer.
Mart Port, 90, Estonian architect.
Jacob Salatun, 84, Indonesian ufologist.
Andrzej Szczeklik, 73, Polish physician and educational administrator (Jagiellonian University Medical College).
*Toh Chin Chye, 90, Singaporean politician, Deputy Prime Minister (1965–1968) and Minister for Health (1975–1981).
Wilhelm Wachtmeister, 88, Swedish diplomat, Ambassador to the United States (1974–1989).
Norton Zinder, 83, American microbiologist, pneumonia.

4
István Csurka, 77, Hungarian playwright and politician, Chairman of the Hungarian Justice and Life Party (since 1993).
Robert Daniel, 75, American politician, U.S. Representative from Virginia (1973–1983).
Mike deGruy, 60, American documentary filmmaker (Trials of Life, The Blue Planet), helicopter crash.
Václav Dosbaba, 67, Czech painter.
Nigel Doughty, 54, British businessman, owner (since 1999) and chairman (2001–2011) of Nottingham Forest F.C.
George Duncan, 75, Scottish footballer.
Soledad Duterte, 95, Filipino teacher and activist.
Joseph W. Estabrook, 67, American Roman Catholic prelate, Auxiliary Bishop of the Military Services (since 2004) and Titular Bishop of Flenucleta.
Harry F. Franke, Jr., 89, American politician.
Robert Glaser, 91, American cognitive psychologist, complications from Alzheimer's disease.
Florence Green, 110, British supercentenarian, last surviving veteran of World War I.
Fernando Lanhas, 88, Portuguese painter.
Hubert Leitgeb, 46, Italian Olympic biathlete, two-time world champion, avalanche.
Irene McKinney, 72, American poet, Poet Laureate of West Virginia (since 1994), cancer.
Livio Minelli, 85, Italian former European welterweight champion boxer.
Wendell Mitchell, 71, American politician, Alabama State Senator (1974–2010), heart failure.
Nicolás Moreno, 88, Mexican landscape painter.
Jeffrey Perry, 63, British stage and screen actor (The Chronicles of Narnia).
Sir Alan Reay, 86, British Army officer, Director General Army Medical Services (1981–1984).
Pierre-Eugène Rouanet, 94,  French-born Ivorian Roman Catholic prelate, Bishop of Daloa (1956–1975).
János Sebestyén, 80, Hungarian organist.
Giovanni Volta, 83,  Italian Roman Catholic prelate, Bishop of Pavia (1986–2003).
Andrew Wight, 51, Australian screenwriter and producer (Sanctum), helicopter crash.
Pongphan Wongsuwan, 61, Thai football manager (TOT S.C.).

5
José Luis Álvarez, 94, Guatemalan artist.
Violeta Autumn, 81, Peruvian-born American architect and artist.
Blaine, 74, Canadian editorial cartoonist.
Royal Cathcart, 85, American football player.
Colin Churchett, 86, Australian footballer.
Sam Coppola, 79, American actor (Saturday Night Fever, Fatal Attraction).
Al De Lory, 82, American record producer.
Lady Ganga, 45, American humanitarian, cervical cancer.
Jef Gilson, 85, French musician.
Bill Hinzman, 75, American actor (Night of the Living Dead), cancer.
Ray Honeyford, 77, English headmaster and writer.
 William D. Houser, 90, American vice admiral (World War II, Korea, Vietnam), Alzheimer's disease and pneumonia.
*Jiang Ying, 92, Chinese opera singer and music teacher.
Lidiya Khudat Rasulova, 70, Azerbaijani politician, member of Supreme Soviet, Minister of Social Security (1988-1991) and of Education (1993-1997).
Peter Kerim, 57, Ugandan military officer.
John Turner Sargent, Sr., 87, American publisher.
Lawrence Zhang Wen-Chang, 92, Chinese Roman Catholic priest, Apostolic Administrator of Kunming, Dali, and Zhaotong (since 2000).
Jo Zwaan, 89, Dutch Olympic athlete.

6
Billy Bean, 78, American jazz guitarist.
Jean Bingen, 91, Belgian papyrologist and epigrapher.
Peter Breck, 82, American actor (The Big Valley).
Roger Chesneau, 86, French steeplechaser.
Sharada Dwivedi, 69, Indian historian.
Yasuhiro Ishimoto, 90, Japanese photographer, complications following pneumonia and a stroke.
Noel Kelehan, 76, Irish musician (RTÉ Concert Orchestra).
Jim King, 69, British musician (Family).
Jay Lambert, 86, American Olympic boxer.
Juan Vicente Lezcano, 74, Paraguayan footballer.
Matthew Mbu, 82, Nigerian politician and diplomat, Foreign Minister (1993).
Władysław Ogrodziński, 93, Polish historian and writer.
Erik Reitzel, 70, Danish civil engineer.
Bob Roesner, 85, American baseball umpire.
David Rosenhan, 82, American psychologist.
Norma Merrick Sklarek, 85, American architect, heart failure.
Antoni Tàpies, 88, Spanish painter.
István Udvardi, 51, Hungarian Olympic bronze medal-winning (1980) water polo player.
Janice E. Voss, 55, American astronaut, breast cancer.
David A. Winter, 81, Canadian academic.

7
Sam Aluko, 82, Nigerian economist and scholar.
Leonard E. Andera, 77, American politician.
James Baring, 6th Baron Revelstoke, 73, British aristocrat.
Knox Chamblin, 76, American pastor and professor.
Danny Clyburn, 37, American baseball player (Baltimore Orioles, Tampa Bay Devil Rays), shot.
*Patricia Stephens Due, 72, American civil rights activist, cancer.
Ann Dummett, 81, British activist.
Devy Erlih, 83, French violinist.
Peter Goddard, 80, New Zealand educationalist.
Marie-Louise Haumont, 93, Belgian writer.
Florence Holway, 96, American advocate for rape victims.
Harry Keough, 84, American soccer player and coach.
Sergio Larraín, 81, Chilean photographer.
Robert Maxwell, 90, American songwriter and harpist.
Phil Shanahan, 84, Irish hurler.

8
Shane Atwell, 41, Barbadian sailor.
Bill Benson, 91, Canadian ice hockey player.
Theophilus Brown, 92, American painter.
Phil Bruns, 80, American actor (Mary Hartman, Mary Hartman, Barney Miller, The Great Waldo Pepper).
Dennis Callahan, 70, American politician, Mayor of Annapolis (1985–1989), heart attack.
Robert Christie, 69, English cricketer.
John Cunningham, 72, Irish journalist, editor of Connacht Tribune (1984–2007), illness.
Alain Danilet, 64, French politician.
Laurent Desjardins, 88, Canadian politician.
Jacques Duchesne-Guillemin, 101, French philologist.
John Fairfax, 74, British ocean rower and adventurer.
Giangiacomo Guelfi, 87, Italian opera singer.
Robert E. Hecht, 92, American antiquities dealer.
Lew Hitch, 82, American basketball player (Minneapolis Lakers, Milwaukee Hawks, Philadelphia Warriors).
Jorge Salvador Lara, 85, Ecuadorian historian and politician, Minister of Foreign Affairs (1966, 1976–1977).
Franca Maï, 52, French actress, cancer.
Laurie Main, 89, Australian-born character actor (Welcome to Pooh Corner).
Enrique Moreno Bellver, 48, Spanish footballer.
Gunther Plaut, 99, German-born Canadian rabbi and author.
Jimmy Sabater, 75, American Latin musician.
Allan Segal, 70, British documentary maker, cancer.
Luis Alberto Spinetta, 62, Argentine musician (Almendra, Pescado Rabioso, Invisible), lung cancer.
Irina Turova, 76, Soviet sprinter.
Wando, 66, Brazilian singer, cardiorespiratory arrest.
Brayim Younisi, 85, Iranian Kurdish writer, novelist and translator.

9
Adam Adamowicz, 42, American video game concept artist (The Elder Scrolls V: Skyrim, Fallout 3), cancer.
Ole Albrechtsen, 87, Danish Olympic fencer.
Robert Baker, 85, American ice hockey player.
Jill Kinmont Boothe, 75, American alpine skier.
Peggy Crowe, 56, American Olympic speed skater.
Susarla Dakshinamurthi, 90,  Indian film music director, playback singer, and record producer.
Fred Dickson, 74, Canadian lawyer and politician, Senator (since 2009), colon cancer.
O. P. Dutta, 90, Indian film director, complications of pneumonia.
Josh Gifford, 70, British racehorse jockey and trainer, heart attack.
John Hick, 90, English philosopher and theologian.
Barbara Marianowska, 64, British-born Polish politician.
Joe Moretti, 73, British guitarist, lung cancer.
Oscar Núñez, 83, Argentine actor (Good Life Delivery), cancer.
Don Panciera, 84, American football player (New York Yankees, Detroit Lions, Chicago Cardinals).

10
Ibrahim Al-Faqi, 61, Egyptian-born Canadian neuro-linguistic programming expert, homefire.
Chuck Baird, 64, American artist.
Geoffrey Cornish, 97, American golf course architect.
R. T. France, 73, British New Testament scholar.
Ronald Fraser, 81, English historian.
John Gage, 73, British art historian.
Joseph Gaggero, 84, Gibraltarian businessman.
Filippo Giannini, 88, Italian Roman Catholic prelate, Auxiliary Bishop of Rome (1980–1998).
Ed Harrison, 84, Canadian ice hockey player (New York Rangers, Boston Bruins).
Francisco de Guruceaga Iturriza, 84, Venezuelan Roman Catholic prelate, Bishop of La Guaira (1973–2001).
Brian Jones, 67, British intelligence analyst.
Andrey Korotkov, 57, Russian politician, after long illness.
Lloyd Morrison, 54, New Zealand businessman (Infratil), leukemia.
Wilmot Perkins, 80, Jamaican radio personality.
David Anthony Pizzuto, 60, Canadian-born American voice actor (Family Guy, Call of Duty: Modern Warfare 3).
Ivan Pravilov, 48, Ukrainian ice hockey coach, suicide.
Refuse To Bend, 11, Irish Thoroughbred racehorse, winner of the National Stakes (2002) and 2,000 Guineas Stakes (2003), myocardial infarction.
James Riordan, 75, English novelist and academic.
Adolfo Schwelm Cruz, 88, Argentine racing driver.
Jeffrey Zaslow, 53, American author and columnist, car accident.

11
Siri Bjerke, 53, Norwegian politician, Minister of the Environment (2000–2001), cancer.
Volodymyr Borysovsky, 78, Ukrainian builder, electrical engineer, and politician.
David Craven, 60, American art historian.
Gene Crumling, 89, American baseball player (St. Louis Cardinals).
Aharon Davidi, 85, Israeli general.
Guido Fanti, 86, Italian politician.
Trent Frayne, 93, Canadian sportswriter.
Whitney Houston, 48, American singer ("I Will Always Love You") and actress (The Bodyguard), accidental drowning.
John Sperry, 87, Canadian Anglican Bishop of the Arctic (1974–1990).

12
Galal Amer, 59, Egyptian journalist, heart attack.
Zina Bethune, 66, American actress (Sunrise at Campobello), hit-and-run.
Malcolm Devitt, 75, English footballer.
Denis Flannery, 83, Australian rugby league player.
Adrian Foley, 8th Baron Foley, 88, British musician and aristocrat.
David Kelly, 82, Irish actor (Fawlty Towers, Strumpet City, Charlie and the Chocolate Factory).
Gratia Schimmelpenninck van der Oye, 99, Dutch Olympic alpine skier (1936).
John Severin, 90, American comic book artist (Hulk), co-founder of Mad magazine.
Victor-François, 8th duc de Broglie, 62, French aristocrat.
David Alan Walker, 83, British scientist.
Howard Zimmerman, 85, American professor of chemistry.

13
Wendy Albano, 52, American businesswoman, strangled.
Russell Arms, 92, American singer (Your Hit Parade) and actor (The Man Who Came to Dinner).
Lillian Bassman, 94, American photographer.
Ladislau Biernaski, 74, Brazilian Roman Catholic prelate, Bishop of São José dos Pinhais (since 2006), cancer.
Frank Braña, 77, Spanish film actor, respiratory failure.
Al Brenner, 64, American football player (New York Giants, Hamilton Tiger-Cats).
Jodie Christian, 80, American jazz pianist.
Louise Cochrane, 93, American-born British television producer.
Trevor Davey, 85, New Zealand politician.
Eamonn Deacy, 53, Irish footballer, member of Aston Villa championship-winning team (1981), heart attack.
Sophie Desmarets, 89, French actress.
Humayun Faridi, 59, Bangladeshi actor.
Maria Fischer-Slyzh, 89, Ukrainian-Canadian pediatrician and philanthropist.
Daniel C. Gerould, 84, American playwright and academic.
David Griffiths, 84, British Anglican clergyman, Archdeacon of Berkshire (1987–1992).
Kushimaumi Keita, 46, Japanese sumo wrestler and coach (Tagonoura), ischaemic heart disease.
Anwar Kamal Khan, 64, Pakistani politician, cardiac failure.
Akhlaq Mohammed Khan, 75, Indian poet, lyricist and academic, lung cancer.
Isaak B. Klejman, 91, Ukrainian Soviet archaeologist.
Mohamed Lamari, 72/73, Algerian lieutenant general, Chief of Staff of the People's National Army (1993–2004), heart attack.
*Víctor Manuel Liceaga Ruibal, 77, Mexican politician, Governor of Baja California Sur (1987–1993), respiratory failure.
Severo Lombardoni, 62, Italian music producer.
Jim O'Brien, 64, Scottish film and television director (The Young Indiana Jones Chronicles).
Leta Peer, 47, Swiss painter and fine art photographer.
Sansón, 87, Spanish football player.
Freddie Solomon, 59, American football player (Miami Dolphins, San Francisco 49ers), colon and liver cancer.
Edward Groesbeck Voss, 82, American botanist and lepidopterist.

14
V. S. Acharya, 71, Indian politician.
Mike Bernardo, 42, South African boxer, kickboxer and martial artist.
Desmond Carroll, 93, English archdeacon.
Zlatko Crnković, 76, Croatian actor, cardiac arrest.
Ibragimkhalil Daudov, 51, Russian militant leader of the Vilayat Dagestan, shot.
Erwin Fiedor, 68, Polish Olympic ski jumper.
Reinhold Frosch, 76, Austrian luger.
Gloria Gallardo, 73, American activist.
Kim Pong-chol, 69, North Korean politician.
Tonmi Lillman, 38, Finnish musician (Ajattara, Sinergy, To/Die/For, Lordi).
Earl Lindley, 78, American football player (Edmonton Eskimos).
Tom McAnearney, 79, Scottish footballer (Sheffield Wednesday, Peterborough United, Aldershot).
Dory Previn, 86, American singer-songwriter (Mythical Kings and Iguanas) and lyricist (Valley of the Dolls, Last Tango in Paris).
Péter Rusorán, 71, Hungarian water polo player and coach, Olympic champion.
Art Tait, 83, American football player.
Alfredo Vega, 77, Paraguayan footballer.

15
Tariq al-Dahab, 34-38, Yemeni terrorist, shot.
Charles Anthony, 82, American tenor, kidney failure.
Ray Bailey, 76, Australian politician, President of the Tasmanian Legislative Council (1997–2002).
Bibudhendra Mishra, 83, Indian politician.
Sir Alan Cottrell, 92, British metallurgist and physicist.
Shannon D. Cramer, 90, American admiral.
William H. Dabney, 77, American military officer, awarded Navy Cross.
Cyril Domb, 91, British physicist.
Jacques Duby, 89, French actor.
Joki Freund, 85, German jazz saxophonist.
Zelda Kaplan, 95, American socialite and philanthropist.
Doug McNichol, 81, Canadian football player (Montreal Alouettes, Toronto Argonauts).
Lina Romay, 57, Spanish actress, cancer.
Clive Shakespeare, 62, British-born Australian guitarist (Sherbet) and record producer, prostate cancer.
James Whitaker, 71, British journalist, royal editor of the Daily Mirror, cancer.
Gerrit Ybema, 66, Dutch politician, State Secretary for Economic Affairs (1998–2002), lung cancer.
John J. Yeosock, 74, American lieutenant general, lung cancer.

16
Duško Antunović, 65, Croatian Olympic water polo player and coach.
Gösta Arvidsson, 86, Swedish Olympic athlete.
Chikage Awashima, 87, Japanese actress (Takarazuka Revue), pancreatic cancer.
Mitja Brodar, 91, Slovenian archaeologist.
Tiko Campbell, 64, American author and architect.
Gary Carter, 57, American Hall of Fame baseball player (Montreal Expos, New York Mets), brain tumor.
Shlomo Cohen-Tzidon, 89, Israeli politician.
Donald Henry Colless, 89, Australian entomologist.
Israel "Bo" Curtis, 79, American educator and funeral home insurance agent.
René Debenne, 97, French cyclist.
Sir Baddeley Devesi, 70, Solomon Islander politician, first Governor-General (1978–1988).
Jacques Forest, 91, French carcinologist.
Warren Hudson, 49, Canadian football player (Toronto Argonauts, Winnipeg Blue Bombers), brain cancer.
Elyse Knox, 94, American actress and model, mother of Mark Harmon.
Joy Lamason, 96, New Zealand cricketer.
Reidar T. Larsen, 88, Norwegian politician, member of parliament (1973–1977).
John Macionis, 95, American Olympic silver medal-winning (1936) swimmer.
Kathryn McGee, 91, American disability rights advocate.
Harry McPherson, 82, American lawyer and lobbyist, advisor to Lyndon B. Johnson, cancer.
*Geevarghese Mar Osthathios, 93, Indian Orthodox bishop, Senior Metropolitan of the Malankara Orthodox Syrian Church.
Anil Ramdas, 54, Surinamese-born Dutch columnist and journalist (NRC Handelsblad).
Ronald Rindestu, 69, Norwegian politician.
John Ritchie, 67, English footballer.
Anthony Shadid, 43, American journalist, asthma.
Ethel Stark, 95, Canadian violinist and conductor.
Gene Vance, 88, American basketball player (Chicago Stags, Tri-Cities Blackhawks, Milwaukee Hawks).
Dick Anthony Williams, 77, American actor (Edward Scissorhands, The Jerk, Homefront), after long illness.

17
Rodolfo Acevedo, 60, Chilean historian.
Nicolaas Govert de Bruijn, 93, Dutch mathematician.
Robert Carr, Baron Carr of Hadley, 95, British politician, MP for Mitcham (1950–1974) & Carshalton (1974–1976); Home Secretary (1972–1974).
Jordan da Costa, 79, Brazilian footballer (Flamengo), diabetes.
Clarence Dart, 91, American World War II fighter pilot (Tuskegee Airmen).
Michael Davis, 68, American bassist (MC5), liver failure.
Winkie Direko, 82, South African politician, Premier of the Free State (1999–2004), stroke.
Pierre Francisse, 87, Belgian Olympic fencer.
Danny Halloran, 57, Australian footballer (Carlton).
Kurt Lehovec, 93, American physicist.
Ulric Neisser, 83, American psychologist.
Hank Nelson, 74, Australian historian, cancer.
Peter Novick, 77, American historian.
Howie Nunn, 76, American baseball player (St. Louis Cardinals, Cincinnati Reds).
Frank Sanders, 62, American Olympic silver medal-winning (1972) ice hockey player, pancreatic cancer.

18
Roald Aas, 83, Norwegian Olympic gold (1960) and bronze (1952) medal-winning speed skater.
Alex Anisi, Papua New Guinean politician.
Mariam Behruzi, 66-67, Iranian lawyer.
József Breznay, 95, Hungarian painter.
George Brizan, 69, Grenadian politician, Prime Minister (1995), diabetes.
João Viegas Carrascalão, 65, East Timorese politician.
Zvezdan Čebinac, 72, Serbian football player and manager.
Elizabeth Connell, 65, South African soprano, cancer.
Clementina Díaz y de Ovando, 96, Mexican writer and academic.
Linda Estrella, 89, Fillipina actress.
M. R. D. Foot, 92, English military historian.
Ken Goodwin, 78, English comedian (The Comedians), Alzheimer's disease.
Peter Halliday, 87, Welsh actor (Doctor Who, The Remains of the Day).
Miles Jackson-Lipkin, 87, British barrister, Hong Kong High Court judge (1981–1987), social welfare fraudster.
*María Amalia Lacroze de Fortabat, 90, Argentine business executive and philanthropist.
Matt Lamb, 79, American painter.
Bertie Messitt, 81, Irish Olympic athlete (1960).
Roger Miner, 77, American senior federal appellate judge, heart failure.
Cal Murphy, 79, Canadian football coach and general manager (Winnipeg Blue Bombers).
Peter Sharp, 72, New Zealand first class cricketer (Canterbury) and cricket commentator, cancer.
Ric Waite, 78, American cinematographer (Red Dawn, Footloose, 48 Hrs.).
Mohammed Wardi, 79, Sudanese singer and songwriter, kidney complications.

19
Hubert Braun, 72, German Olympic bobsledder.
Georgi Cherkelov, 81, Bulgarian actor, stroke.
Robin Corbett, Baron Corbett of Castle Vale, 78, British politician, MP for Hemel Hempstead (1974–1979) and Birmingham Erdington (1983–2001), cancer.
Renato Dulbecco, 97, Italian-born American virologist, Nobel laureate in Physiology or Medicine (1975).
Avraham Fahn, 95, Israeli professor.
Vito Giacalone, 88, American mobster.
Eric Harris, 56, American football player (Toronto Argonauts, Kansas City Chiefs, Los Angeles Rams), heart attack.
J. Paul Hogan, 92, American research chemist.
Steve Kordek, 100, American pinball machine designer.
Giovanni Lilliu, 97, Italian archeologist.
Ruth Barcan Marcus, 90, American philosopher and logician.
Walter Schloss, 95, American investor and stock trader, leukemia.
Dick Smith, 72, American baseball player (Los Angeles Dodgers, New York Mets).
* So Man-sul, 84, North Korean Zainichi activist, Chongryon Central Standing Committee chairman.
Frits Staal, 81, Dutch philosopher.
Stasys Stonkus, 80, Lithuanian basketball player.
Herman G. Tillman, Jr., 89, American pilot (World War II, Korea, Vietnam), liver failure.
Jaroslav Velinský, 79, Czech science fiction and detective author.
Vitaly Vorotnikov, 86, Soviet politician, Chairman of the Presidium of the Supreme Soviet of the Russian SFSR (1988–1990).

20
Foyez Ahmad, 84, Bangladeshi journalist, writer and cultural activist.
Clive Baker, 77, English footballer (Halifax Town).
Raymond Cicci, 82, French footballer
Knut Torbjørn Eggen, 51, Norwegian Olympic football player and coach.
Asar Eppel, 77, Russian translator, stroke.
Johnny Ezersky, 89, American basketball player.
Ra Ganapati, 76, Indian writer.
Sebhat Gebre-Egziabher, 76, Ethiopian author.
Imanuel Geiss, 81, German historian.
Marcel Gerdil, 84, French sprinter.
Katie Hall, 73, American politician, U.S. Representative from Indiana (1982–1985).
S. N. Lakshmi, 85, Indian actress, cardiac arrest.
Lydia Lamaison, 97, Argentine actress (Muñeca Brava).
Christoffer Schander, 51, Norwegian marine biologist.
Michael Siegal, 61, British developmental psychologist.
Adrienne Smith, 78, Australian sport administrator.
John Steer, 83, British art historian.
Edgardo Gabriel Storni, 75, Argentine Roman Catholic prelate, Archbishop of Santa Fe de la Vera Cruz (1984–2002).
Tamanna, 64, Pakistani actress.
Sullivan Walker, 68, Trinidadian actor (The Cosby Show, Get Rich or Die Tryin'), heart attack.

21
Ranil Abeynaike, 57, Sri Lankan cricketer and commentator, heart attack.
James Blackett-Ord, 90, British judge and churchman.
Ajahn Chanda Thawaro, 90, Thai Buddhist monk.
Sarbari Roy Choudhury, 79, Indian sculptor, heart attack.
H. M. Darmstandler, 89, American Air Force officer.
Herman Fialkov, 89, American entrepreneur, venture capitalist, and philanthropist.
Manuel Franco da Costa de Oliveira Falcão, 89, Portuguese Roman Catholic prelate, Bishop of Beja (1980–1999).
Emlyn Hooson, Baron Hooson, 86, British politician, MP for Montgomeryshire (1962–1979).
Colin Ireland, 57, British serial killer.
Pierre Juneau, 89, Canadian broadcasting executive and cabinet minister, Minister of Communications (1975), namesake of the Juno Awards.
Fay Kleinman, 99, American painter, complications of a broken hip.
Vera Kublanovskaya, 91, Russian mathematician.
Yusuf Kurçenli, 65, Turkish film director, cancer.
Tom Martinez, 66, American football coach, heart attack.
John Michuki, 79, Kenyan politician, heart attack.
Benjamin Romualdez, 81, Filipino politician and diplomat, Governor of Leyte (1967–1986), brother of Imelda Marcos, cancer.
Leonard Rosoman, 98, British artist.
Barney Rosset, 89, American publisher (Grove Press) and free speech advocate.
Eldor Magomatovich Urazbayev, 71, Russian film director.
Stanisław Wieśniak, 81, Polish Olympic rower.
John Charles Winter, 88, British church organist.

22
Ali Abolhassani, 56, Iranian spiritual historiograph, heart failure.
Syed Mohammad Izhar Ashraf, 78, Indian imam.
Frank Carson, 85, Northern Irish comedian.
Marie Colvin, 56, American reporter (The Sunday Times), shelling.
Nakamura Jakuemon IV, 91, Japanese kabuki actor, pneumonia.
Lyudmila Kasatkina, 86, Russian actress, People's Artist of the USSR.
Thabang Lebese, 38, South African footballer, AIDS-related illness.
Lorin Levee, 61, American clarinetist (Los Angeles Philharmonic).
João Mansur, 88, Brazilian politician, Governor of Paraná (1973).
Robert R. McElroy, 84, American photographer.
Mike Melvoin, 74, American jazz pianist and composer, cancer.
Dmitri Nabokov, 77, American opera singer and translator.
Rémi Ochlik, 28, French photographer, shelling.
Royal Academy, 25, Irish Thoroughbred racehorse, winner of the Breeders' Cup Mile (1990).
Haycene Ryan, 60, Montserratian cricketer, cancer.
Ian Robertson, 89, British rear admiral.
Cuauhtémoc Sandoval Ramírez, 61, Mexican politician, heart attack.
Enzo Sellerio, 88, Italian photographer, heart attack.
Billy Strange, 81, American songwriter ("Limbo Rock") and music arranger.
Sukhbir, 86, Indian writer.

23
Tasoltan Basiev, 64, Soviet and Russian engineer.
Dick Bernard, 94, Scottish lawn bowler.
Cathy Campbell, 49, New Zealand broadcaster, brain tumour.
Charlie Collins, 66, Canadian football player, car accident.
Anne Commire, 72, American playwright.
William Gay, 70, American author.
Peter King, 47, English footballer.
Grigory Kosykh, 79, Soviet sports shooter.
Mariuccia Medici, 102, Swiss-born Italian actress.
William Raggio, 85, American politician, Nevada State Senator (1972–2011), respiratory illness.
David Sayre, 87, American scientist.
Marc Soula, 66, French entomologist.
Bruce Surtees, 74, American cinematographer (Lenny, Dirty Harry, Beverly Hills Cop).
Jan van Borssum Buisman, 92, Dutch painter.
Kazimierz Żygulski, 92, Polish sociologist and politician.

24
Infanta Maria Adelaide of Portugal, 100, Portuguese royal.
Tony Aiello, 90, American football player.
Agnes Allen, 81, American baseball player (All-American Girls Professional Baseball League).
István Anhalt, 92, Hungarian-born Canadian composer.
Bob Badgley, 83, American jazz double-bassist.
Jan Berenstain, 88, American writer and illustrator (Berenstain Bears), stroke.
Benedict Freedman, 92, American novelist and mathematician.
Njenga Karume, 82, Kenyan businessman and politician, cancer.
Theodore Mann, 87, American theatre producer and director.
Terry Mathews, 47, American baseball player (Texas Rangers, Florida Marlins, Baltimore Orioles), heart attack.
Kenneth Price, 77, American ceramics artist, cancer.
Pery Ribeiro, 74, Brazilian singer, myocardial infarction.
Eliana Tranchesi, 56, Brazilian chief executive (Daslu).
 Jay Ward, 73, American baseball player (Minnesota Twins, Cincinnati Reds).
Oliver Wrong, 87, British medical academic.

25
Gloria Alcorta, 96, Argentine writer, poet and sculptor.
Maurice André, 78, French classical trumpeter.
Dave Cheadle, 60, American baseball player (Atlanta Braves).
Lynn Compton, 90, American soldier, inspiration for Band of Brothers, heart attack.
Dick Davies, 76, American gold-medal winning Olympic basketball player (1964).
Alan Detweiler, 85, Canadian composer, author, and patron of the arts.
Lloyd R. George, 85, American politician, member of the Arkansas House of Representatives (1963–1967; 1973–1997).
Red Holloway, 84, American jazz saxophonist, stroke and kidney failure.
Erland Josephson, 88, Swedish actor and author, leader of the Royal Dramatic Theatre in Stockholm, complications of Parkinson's disease.
Louisiana Red, 79, American blues musician, stroke.

26
Ed Brigadier, 62, American actor (Pushing Daisies, Gilmore Girls).
Phyllis Simmons Brooks, 85, Canadian educator.
Richard Carpenter, 82, English television screenwriter.
Robinson Cavalcanti, 67, Brazilian Anglican bishop, stabbed.
Paddy Concannon, 93, Irish politician.
Árpád Fekete, 90, Hungarian football player and coach.
Mohamed Fourati, 80, Tunisian surgeon.
Georg Holzherr, 85, Swiss Roman Catholic prelate, Abbot Ordinary of Territorial Abbacy of Maria Einsiedeln (1969–2001).
Don Joyce, 82, American football player (Baltimore Colts, Chicago Cardinals, Minnesota Vikings).
Hans Christian Korting, 59, German dermatologist.
Kumar Kashyap Mahasthavir, 85, Nepalese Buddhist monk.
Trayvon Martin, 17, American teenager, shot.
Berto Poosen, 67, Belgian Olympic volleyball player.
George E. Terwilleger, 71, American politician.
Johannes Vågsnes, 88, Norwegian politician.
Yvonne Verbeeck, 98, Belgian actress.
Zollie Volchok, 95, American basketball executive.

27
Ely Bielutin, 86, Russian artist.
Louis Bertorelle, 79, French Olympic basketball player.
David Bowman, 54, American writer, cerebral hemorrhage.
Rich Brenner, 65, American sports commentator.
Pedro Azabache Bustamante, 94, Peruvian painter.
Vince Dantona, 62, American ventriloquist.
Leif Eriksen, 93, Norwegian bandy player.
Werner Guballa, 67, German Roman Catholic prelate, Auxiliary Bishop of Mainz (since 2003).
Ma Jiyuan, 91, Chinese military leader.
Sailen Manna, 87, Indian Olympic footballer.
Piotr Pawłowski, 86, Polish actor.
Armand Penverne, 85, French football player.
Tina Strobos, 91, Dutch psychiatrist and humanitarian, protected Jewish refugees during World War II, cancer.
Władysław Tajner, 76, Polish Olympic ski jumper.
Helga Vlahović, 67, Croatian journalist, producer and television personality, uterine cancer.

28
Karl Arnold, 71, German weightlifter.
 Frisner Augustin, 63, Haitian Vodou drummer.
Bai Jing, 29, Chinese actress, stabbed.
Anna Lou Dehavenon, 85, American anthropologist.
Terri Dial, 62, American banker, pancreatic cancer.
Ian Gallahar, Irish road racing cyclist.
Jaime Graça, 70, Portuguese footballer.
Jim Green, 68, American-born Canadian politician and activist, lung cancer.
Fritz Hakl, 80, Austrian actor.
William Hamilton, 87, American theologian.
Anders Kulläng, 68, Swedish rally driver, drowning.
 Antonio Attolini Lack, 80, Mexican architect.
Abukar Hassan Mohamoud, c. 46, Somali journalist, shot.
 Hal Roach, 84, Irish comedian.
 Murray Sargent, 83, Australian cricketer (South Australia, Leicestershire).

29
Roland Bautista, 60, American guitarist (Earth, Wind & Fire).
Ertjies Bezuidenhout, 56, South African cyclist.
Prudence Burns Burrell, 95, American nurse.
Gerald Caravelli, 68, American bridge player.
Dennis Chinnery, 84, British actor (Doctor Who).
Woody Farmer, 76, American wrestler, cancer.
Fukuzo Iwasaki, 86, Japanese businessman.
Davy Jones, 66, British actor and musician (The Monkees), heart attack.
Karl Kodat, 69, Austrian international footballer.
Sheldon Moldoff, 91, American comic book artist (Batman, Superman, Blackhawk), kidney failure.
Horacio Morales, 68, Filipino economist and politician, Secretary of Agrarian Reform (1998–2001), heart attack.
P. K. Narayana Panicker, 81, Indian welfare worker, President of the Nair Service Society.
Vasilis Tsivilikas, 70, Greek comic actor, heart attack.

References

2012-02
 02